Guam Adventist Academy (GAA) is a K-12 private school run by the Seventh-day Adventist Church in Guam and the Seventh-day Adventist Guam Micronesia Mission, in Yona, Guam. The school's Windward Hills campus is across the street from the Windward Hills Golf Club.

In 1949, Pastor Dunton founded what would become the GAA in Dededo, with an enrollment of 26 pupils. The second GAA school in Talofofo was opened in 1951.

By 1957, the two schools merged into one K-12 institution, located in Agaña Heights. In July 1963, the institution secured what would become its current location in Windward Hills.

In 2007, the school had about 100 students.

As of 2010, the school combined the high school graduation and the eighth grade promotion exercises into a single ceremony.

Activities

The athletic teams are called the "Angels."

The school has a career day every year.

Electives offered in the school include Japanese, Spanish, Korean, Handbell Choir, woodworking, small engines, anatomy and physiology, and gardening.

References

External links

 Official Website
 Guam Adventist Academy - Guam-Micronesia Mission of Seventh-day Adventists

Elementary schools in Guam
Middle schools in Guam
Private high schools in Guam
Private schools in Guam
Private K-12 schools in the United States